Bromley High School is a girls' independent school located in Bickley, Greater London, part of the Girls' Day School Trust.

The Good Schools Guide describes the school: "Cool calm atmosphere pervades the corridors which are lined with notice boards announcing forthcoming events and successes. General impression is of a busy and active school."

History
Bromley High School was opened on 18 January 1883 and was the second school founded by the Girls' Public Day School Trust (now Girls' Day School Trust). At that time, Bromley was "a small country town, surrounded by pleasant woods and meadows". The establishment of the school marked the first public recognition in Bromley of the importance of higher education for girls.

The school celebrated its 125th anniversary in 2008. A special concert was held at the Royal Albert Hall to mark the occasion.

In 2008 a pupil in Year 11 was chosen to represent Great Britain at the opening of the Paralympic Games in Beijing.

The author Richmal Crompton was a teacher at the school from c.1917 or 1918.

Academics
Bromley High has traditionally had an excellent academic record as one of the area's top performing independent schools. In 2009, it broke its record in the A Levels with 85.5% of candidates scoring A-B grades.

Notable former pupils

Academic and education 
 Professor Dame Marilyn Strathern, DBE MA PHD MBA, feminist anthropologist who has worked largely with the natives of Papua New Guinea; Mistress of Girton College, Cambridge, 1998–2009 (BHS 1952–59)

Arts 
 Richmal Crompton Lambourn, BA, teacher, author, Senior Classics Mistress at Bromley High until 1923; author of the Just William stories
 Gillian Lynne, CBE, dancer/choreographer 
 Julia Potts, theatre director, Executive Director of the Almeida Theatre
 Sarah Gibb, illustrator
 Susanna White, film director
 Tilly Keeper, BHS class of 2015, actor, plays Louise Mitchell in EastEnders

Business 
 Jo Fairley, co-founder of Green and Black's

Non-profit charity 
 Mary Baker, MBE, MSc Hons, former CEO of Parkinson's Disease Society and former President of the European Federation of Neurological Associations (BHS 1943–53)

Politics 
 Margaret Hodge, MBE, MP, Chair of the Public Accounts Committee 2010–15

References

External links
School Website
Profile on ISC website
ISI Inspection Reports

Schools of the Girls' Day School Trust
Private girls' schools in London
Private schools in the London Borough of Bromley
Educational institutions established in 1883
Member schools of the Girls' Schools Association
1883 establishments in England